Barbara Bloom may refer to:

 Barbara Bloom (television executive), American television executive and writer
 Barbara Bloom (artist) (born 1951), American conceptual artist